Lafayette Township is a township in Story County, Iowa, USA.  As of the 2000 census, its population was 3523.

Geography
According to the USGS, it contains three cemeteries: Fairview Cemetery, Sowers Cemetery and South Saint Petri Cemetery.

U.S. Route 69 runs north and south through the township and County Roads E18 and E15 run east–west.

References
 USGS Geographic Names Information System (GNIS)

External links
 US-Counties.com
 City-Data.com

Townships in Story County, Iowa
Townships in Iowa